Reedley Hallows is a civil parish in Pendle, Lancashire, England.  It contains three listed buildings that are recorded in the National Heritage List for England.  Of these, one is at Grade II*, the middle grade, and the others are at Grade II, the lowest grade.  The parish is partly residential, containing a suburb of Burnley, with countryside to the west.  The listed buildings are all houses, two 17th-century farmhouses, and a modern town house.

Key

Buildings

References

Citations

Sources

Lists of listed buildings in Lancashire
Buildings and structures in the Borough of Pendle